The year 2019 is the 9th year in the history of the Fight Nights Global, a mixed martial arts promotion based in Russia. The company continues broadcasts through Match TV and Fight Network.

List of events

Fight Nights Global 92: Bagautinov vs. Asatryan

'Fight Nights Global 92: Bagautinov vs. Asatryan' was a mixed martial arts event held by Fight Nights Global on April 06, 2019 at the Dynamo Palace Of Sports in Moscow, Russia.

Fight Card

Fight Nights Global 93: Mytyshchi Cup

'Fight Nights Global 93: Mytyshchi Cup' was a mixed martial arts event held by Fight Nights Global on April 26, 2019 at the Mytishchi Arena in Mytishchi, Russia.

Fight Card

Fight Nights Global 94

Fight Nights Global 94 was a mixed martial arts event held by Fight Nights Global on October 12, 2019 in Moscow, Russia.

Fight Card

Fight Nights Global 95

Fight Nights Global 95 was a mixed martial arts event held by Fight Nights Global on October 19, 2019 in Sochi, Russia.

Fight Card

Fight Nights Global 96

'Fight Nights Global 96' was a mixed martial arts event held by Fight Nights Global on December 28, 2019 at the Adrenaline Stadium in Moscow, Russia.

Fight Card

See also
2019 in UFC
2019 in ONE Championship
2019 in Rizin Fighting Federation
2019 in Konfrontacja Sztuk Walki
2019 in Absolute Championship Akhmat
2019 in Legacy Fighting Alliance

References

Fight Nights Global events
2019 in mixed martial arts
AMC Fight Nights